The 2020 Leinster Senior Hurling Championship Final, the deciding game of the 2020 Leinster Senior Hurling Championship, was a hurling match that was played on 14 November 2020 at Croke Park, Dublin. It was contested by Kilkenny and Galway.

Kilkenny captained by Colin Fennelly won the game by 2-20 to 0-24 to win their first Leinster title since 2016 and 72nd overall.

Details

References

Leinster Championship
Leinster Senior Hurling Championship Finals
Galway GAA matches
Kilkenny GAA matches